Stanlawe Grange in Aigburth, Liverpool, England, is the remains of a 13th-century monastic grange. Little remains of the original cruck frame structure. It has been constantly changed and now is a small sandstone structure.

External links
 https://web.archive.org/web/20070929134332/http://www.btinternet.com/~m.royden/mrlhp/local/monastic/mondoc.htm

Grade II* listed buildings in Liverpool